Emile Lahure (born 26 November 1947) is a retired Luxembourgian football defender.

References

1947 births
Living people
Luxembourgian footballers
FC Progrès Niederkorn players
Association football defenders
Luxembourg international footballers